"Centrolene" acanthidiocephalum, commonly known as the Santander giant glass frog, is a species of frog in the family Centrolenidae. Its current placement within the subfamily Centroleninae is uncertain (incertae sedis). It is endemic to Colombia where it is only known from the region of the type locality on the western slope of the Cordillera Oriental in the Santander Department, at the elevations of  asl.

Its natural habitats are cloud forests where it occurs on vegetation next to streams. Its conservation status is unable to be classified due to insufficient data.

References

acanthidiocephalum
Amphibians of Colombia
Endemic fauna of Colombia
Taxonomy articles created by Polbot